Hallatt is a surname. Notable people with the surname include:

Alex Hallatt (born 1969), British cartoonist
David Hallatt (born 1937), English Anglican priest
May Hallatt (1876–1969), British actress

See also
Hallett (disambiguation)